The National Council for the Defense of DemocracyForces for the Defense of Democracy (CNDD–FDD) is the major political party in Burundi. During the Burundian Civil War, the CNDD–FDD was the most significant rebel group active and became a major political party in Burundi. In March 2012, Pascal Nyabenda was elected as President of CNDD–FDD. Then on 20 August 2016, General Évariste Ndayishimiye was, in the extraordinary congress that took place in Gitega, elected as the Secretary General of the Party.

During the civil war, the CNDD was the political wing of the organization, while the FDD was the military wing. The original CNDD was founded in 1994, a year after the first democratically elected President Melchior Ndadaye was killed by elements of Burundi's Tutsi-dominated army in a failed coup d'etat. The political wing was dominated by Hutu intellectuals from the southern region of Bururi led by Léonard Nyangoma, while the armed wing was made up of troops drawn from across the country. During the war, the group was often referred to simply by the name of the armed wing (FDD).

In May 1998, Jean-Bosco Ndayikengurukiye, Nyangoma's chief of staff, caused a schism by ousting the latter over leadership issues and losses suffered by the group during the First Congo War, the Nyangoma-led faction later taking a seat at the Arusha negotiations, while Ndayikengurukiye's faction carried out its fight. In 2001, the CNDD– FDD consisted of about 25,000 rebels, but in September of that year Ndayikengurukiye was ousted by a faction led by Pierre Nkurunziza over the former's handling of negotiations with the government to join the transitional administration set up by in Arusha Accords. The Nkurunziza-led faction, consisting of 20,000 to 22,000 troops signed a ceasefire with the government in December 2002 but continued fighting. The faction led by Ndayikengurukiye became the lesser of the two with about 5,000 fighters.  It also signed a ceasefire with the government in October 2002 to which it has roughly held.

At an official ceremony in January 2005, the group registered as a legal political party. Months later, in the largely peaceful parliamentary elections on 4 July 2005, the CNDD–FDD won an estimated 60 to 80 percent of the vote, making it likely that a CNDD–FDD representative would be chosen the president in August. Pierre Nkurunziza indeed was elected President of Burundi unopposed on August 19. At the legislative elections, the party won 57.8% and 64 out of 118 seats.

CNDD–FDD's youth wing is known as the Imbonerakure. Human Rights Watch has documented claims that members of Imbonerakure have harassed, arbitrarily detained, tortured, and killed alleged members of opponent parties and militias on behalf of the country's security forces, especially since Évariste Ndayishimiye became the president in 2020.

In June 2020, Nkurunziza died while still serving as President of Burundi and was succeeded by Ndayishimiye. Prior to Nkurunziza's death, Ndayishimiye had been elect President of Burundi in elections which were held in May 2020. Former Senate president Révérien Ndikuriyo, a hardliner, was chosen as the Secretary General of the CNDD–FDD in January 2021.

Electoral history

Presidential elections

National Assembly elections

Senate elections

References

Further reading 
 Burihabwa, N., & Curtis, D. (2019). The Limits of Resistance Ideologies? The CNDD-FDD and the Legacies of Governance in Burundi. Government and Opposition, 54(3), 559-583.

External links 
  Ex-Hutu rebels win Burundi poll, BBC 5 July 2005

Political history of Burundi
Political parties in Burundi
Rebel groups in Burundi
1994 establishments in Burundi
Political parties established in 1994
Burundian Civil War
Factions of the First Congo War
Factions of the Second Congo War